Introduction is Alex Parks' debut album, released on 24 November 2003. Recorded and released within only two weeks of Parks winning the BBC's Fame Academy, it included seven original compositions, mostly co-written with  songwriters Helen Boulding, Gary Clark and Boo Hewerdine, as well as six cover songs from John Lennon, Tears for Fears, R.E.M., Christina Aguilera, Eurythmics and Coldplay.

The album reached number 5 in the UK Top 40 Album charts. It has been classified platinum in the UK.

Introduction includes rock influences on "Dirty Pretty Words" and "Wandering Soul", as well as a folk pop acoustic track, "Not Your Average Kind of Girl".

The lead single "Maybe That's What It Takes" was released on 17 November 2003 and peaked at number 3 in the UK Top 40 the following week.  The second single "Cry" was released on 16 February 2004, and charted at number 13.

The song "Stones & Feathers" was adapted in French under the title "De l'Eau" (Some Water) and used as the debut single of Elodie Frégé, winner of the third season of "Star Academy".

Track listing
"Maybe That's What It Takes" - 3:54 (Alex Parks, Helen Boulding)
"Cry" - 3:49 (Parks, Gary Clark, Boo Hewerdine) 
"Dirty Pretty Words" - 3:10 (Parks, Clark, Hewerdine) 
"Imagine" - 3:13 (John Lennon)
"Not Your Average Kind of Girl" - 3:37 (Parks, Carolynne Good, James Fox)
"Mad World" - 3:03 (Roland Orzabal)
"Everybody Hurts" - 5:44 (Bill Berry, Mike Mills, Peter Buck, Michael Stipe)
"Beautiful" - 3:59 (Linda Perry)
"Stones & Feathers" - 3:07 (Justin Gray, Blair MacKichan, Stefan Skarbek, Parks)  
"Here Comes the Rain Again" - 3:20 (Annie Lennox, David A Stewart)
"Yellow" - 4:30 (Guy Berryman, Jon Buckland, Will Champion, Chris Martin) 
"Wandering Soul" - 3:31 (Parks, Clark, Hewerdine)
"Over Conscious" - 3:37 (Parks, Glenn Skinner, Luciana Caporaso)

Chart performance
In the United Kingdom, Introduction debuted at #5.

Certifications

References

External links
Allmusic - Alex Parks
Radiohead praise Alex Parks, Feb 2004
Shakenstir - INTRODUCTION album review
Guardian Unlimited - INTRODUCTION album review
Playlouder - INTRODUCTION album review

2003 debut albums
Alex Parks albums
Polydor Records albums